Cheshmeh Chenar-e Mard Khoda (also Romanized as Cheshmeh Chenār-e Mard Khodā; also known as Cheshmeh Chenār, Dūlchandar, and Dūlchendār) is a village in Kabgian Rural District, Kabgian District, Dana County, Kohgiluyeh and Boyer-Ahmad Province, Iran. At the 2006 census, its population was 28, in 6 families.

References 

Populated places in Dana County